Ted W. Brown (April 19, 1906 – August 20, 1984) was an American politician of the Ohio Republican party and long-time Ohio Secretary of State.

First elected in 1950, he was re-elected eight times.  In 1970, Brown defeated Ohio Democrat John F. Kennedy. In 1974, Brown won re-election by defeating Democrat Tony P. Hall. In 1978, Brown lost his seat when he was narrowly defeated by Anthony J. Celebrezze Jr. in a race that required a recount.

He died in 1984 at his Columbus home of cancer, aged 78.

References

Secretaries of State of Ohio
Ohio Republicans
1906 births
1984 deaths
20th-century American politicians